The 1923–24 Gold Cup was the 12th edition of the Gold Cup, a cup competition in Northern Irish football.

The tournament was won by Linfield for the sixth time, defeating Distillery 1–0 in the final at The Oval.

Results

First round

|}

Replay

|}

Quarter-finals

|}

Semi-finals

|}

Final

References

1923–24 in Northern Ireland association football